Basilea Pharmaceutica is a multinational specialty biopharmaceutical company headquartered in Basel, Switzerland. It was formed as a spin-off entity from the drug giant Hoffmann–La Roche in October 2000. It is engaged in the development of antibiotics, antifungals and oncology drugs for treatment of invasive aspergillosis and invasive mucormycosis. Basilea is publicly traded on the SIX Swiss exchange.

The company is based in Basel, Switzerland.  It has subsidiaries in France (Basilea Pharmaceuticals SAS), Germany (Basilea Pharmaceuticals GmbH), Denmark (Basilea Pharmaceuticals A/S), the People's Republic of China (Basilea Pharmaceutica China Ltd), Spain (Basilea Pharmaceuticals Iberia SL), the United Kingdom (Basilea Pharmaceuticals Ltd.), and the United States of America (Basilea Pharmaceuticals Inc.).  According to stock filings, it had 196 employees as of June 2007.

Among the company's notable products is Isavuconazole (CRESEMBA), an intravenous and oral antifungal, which received orphan drug status designation by the United States Food and Drug Administration (FDA) in 2013. The company also manufactures pharmaceuticals for use against methicillin-resistant Staphylococcus aureus.

Company history

Basilea Pharmaceutica was founded in 2000 as a spin-off entity of pharmaceutical giant Hoffman-LaRoche. In 2002, the company founded Basilea Pharmaceutica China Ltd., a research facility located in Haimen Technology Development Zone, north of Shanghai, China, which it operates as a wholly owned subsidiary.  Basilea is marketing Toctino (alitretinoin), for the treatment of severe chronic hand eczema, in Denmark, France, Germany, Switzerland and the United Kingdom. The drug is approved in 14 additional European countries as well as in Canada and has been recommended for approval in eight further European countries. Ceftobiprole is a cephalosporin antibiotic with activity against methicillin-resistant Staphylococcus aureus being developed in cooperation with Johnson & Johnson was approved in Europe in October 2013. Isavuconazole, a broad-spectrum triazole antifungal drug in Phase III clinical development  has won orphan drug status in the United States. Basilea partnered with pharmaceutical company Astellas Pharma Inc., which holds the U.S. rights to the drug, to conduct two phase 3 clinical trials. The trials demonstrated safety and efficacy in adults with invasive fungal infections. Following these trials, the FDA granted approval for the use of isavuconazole in patients with invasive aspergillosis and invasive mucormycosis, diseases that typically occur in immunocompromised patients.

R&D and manufacturing operations

Antibiotics research
Basilea's antibiotic research efforts emphasize optimizing established drug mechanisms, such as beta-lactamase inhibition, as well as identification of molecular targets not currently being exploited in the antibiotic arena, with particular focus on novel inhibitors of bacterial cell-wall bio-synthesis and cell division.

Basilea coordinates with other pharmaceutical companies and public research organizations as part of the NewDrugs4BadBugs program. A program of the Innovative Medicine Initiative (IMI) that partners pharmaceutical companies with academic institutions and biotech organizations in an effort to solve the scientific, regulatory and business challenges posed by antibiotic resistance.

Oncology research
The company directs its oncology research towards development of antitumor drugs that overcome drug-resistance problems associated with currently available cancer treatment drugs for both hematological and solid cancers.

Products
Its products include:
 Isavuconazole, trade name CRESEMBA, an intravenous and oral antifungal
 Ceftobiprole, trade names Zevtera®/Mabelio®, an intravenous broad-spectrum antibiotic suitable for use against methicillin-resistant Staphylococcus aureus (MRSA)
 Alitretinoin, trade name Toctino®, a retinoid-based oral drug
 BAL101553, an oral oncology drug in development for treatment of numerous types of cancer. BAL101553 functions as a tumor checkpoint controller. It is currently in clinical phase 1/2a trials in patients with advanced solid tumors, including bowel, stomach, ovarian, pancreatic and non small cell lung cancers. 
 BAL3833, an oral oncology drug candidate, this panRAF inhibitor halts tumour cell proliferation via kinase inhibition. Currently undergoing phase 1 safety trials in patients with advanced solid tumours. One such trial is an 18-month study involving patients with metastatic melanoma sponsored by The Institute of Cancer Research (ICR) and The Royal Marsden NHS Foundation Trust.
 BAL30072, an experimental antibiotic. The drug is being adapted for inhalation on the presumption that this delivery method may improve safety and effectiveness in managing these conditions. A 5-year independent study will be carried out on inhalation therapy with BAL30072  by a group of pulmonologists and lung specialists from the inhaled Antibiotics in Bronchiectasis and Cystic fibrosis Consortium (iABC).

See also 
 List of pharmaceutical companies
 Pharmaceutical industry in Switzerland

References

Pharmaceutical companies of Switzerland
Manufacturing companies based in Basel
Companies listed on the SIX Swiss Exchange
Pharmaceutical companies established in 2000
Swiss companies established in 2000